Roderigo is a fictional character in Shakespeare's Othello (c.1601-1604), where he serves as the secondary antagonist of the play.  He is a dissolute Venetian lusting after Othello's wife Desdemona.  Roderigo has opened his purse to Iago in the mistaken belief that Iago is using his money to pave the way to Desdemona's bed.  When the assassination of Michael Cassio runs amiss, Iago fatally wounds Roderigo.

Shakespeare's source for Othello was the tale "Un Capitano Moro" by Cinthio, and, while Shakespeare closely followed his source in composing Othello, Roderigo has no counterpart in Cinthio. The character is completely Shakespeare's invention.

Sources
Othello has its source in the 1565 tale "Un Capitano Moro" from Gli Hecatommithi by Giovanni Battista Giraldi Cinthio.  While no English translation of Cinthio was available in print during Shakespeare's lifetime, it is possible the dramatist knew the Italian original, Gabriel Chappuy's 1584 French translation, or an English translation in manuscript. Cinthio's tale may have been based on an actual incident occurring in Venice about 1508.

Role in Othello
Roderigo makes his first appearance in Act One, Scene One when, as Iago's confederate, he rouses Brabantio with the news that Desdemona has eloped with Othello. In the following scene, he accompanies Brabantio to the Sagittary where the newlyweds are found. He is present in Act One Scene Three when the couple defend their union before the Duke. In Act Two Scene One, Roderigo disembarks to Cyprus, and, two scenes later, provokes the brawl that results in Cassio's disgrace. Roderigo next appears in Act Four Scene Two where Iago lures him into a plot to murder Cassio. In Act Five Scene One, Roderigo fails to kill Cassio, and is himself wounded in the attempt. Iago discovers Roderigo and renders the coup de grâce. Finally realising how he has been deceived, Roderigo curses Iago before being stabbed and left for dead. But it is later revealed that he had written letters before his death to tell the truth about Iago's plot. His main role within the plot, therefore, is to show the audience how manipulative and deceiving Iago can be.

Performances
Based on the fact that Othello was composed in near proximity chronologically to the composition of Twelfth Night, modern interpreters of Roderigo sometimes play the role as a dimwit in the manner of Andrew Aguecheek or Rosencrantz and Guildenstern, with the rationale being all four roles would have been played by an actor in Shakespeare's company specializing in foppish characters.

Robert Coote played Roderigo in Orson Welles' 1952 film. The production was filmed over a three-year period and was hampered by its Italian backer declaring bankruptcy early on in the shoot. As a result, a lack of costumes forced Roderigo's murder to be staged in a Turkish bath with the performers garbed in large, ragged towels.

Other film interpreters of the role include Ferdinand von Alten in the 1922 silent version starring Emil Jannings, Robert Lang in the 1965 version starring Laurence Olivier, and Michael Maloney in the film version with Laurence Fishburne.

In 2006, Omkara, the Bollywood version of Othello, Roderigo née Rajan ’Rajju’ Tiwari was played by Deepak Dobriyal.

References

Further reading
 MacLiammóir, Micheál. Put Money in Thy Purse: the Diary of the Film of Othello. Methuen & Co., Ltd., London (1952); Virgin Books (1994), .  MacLiammóir's 1952 memoir about the filming of Orson Welles' Othello.

External links
Open Source Shakespeare: All Lines and Cues for Roderigo in "Othello"

Literary characters introduced in 1603
Fictional Italian people in literature
Male Shakespearean characters
Othello
Shakespeare villains